Zalha is a commune located in Sălaj County, Transylvania, Romania. It is composed of seven villages: Ceaca (Almáscsáka), Ciureni (Csurenypuszta), Valea Ciurenilor (Csurenyvölgy), Valea Hranei (Tormapataka), Valea Lungă (Gorbómező), Vârteșca (Virtyeskatelep) and Zalha.

Sights 
 Wooden Church in Ciureni, built in the 18th century (1776)
 Wooden Church in Zalha, built in the 19th century (1821)

References

Communes in Sălaj County
Localities in Transylvania